The 2015 EPZ Omloop van Borsele was the 13th running of the Omloop van Borsele, a women's cycling event in 's-Heerenhoek, the Netherlands.

Results

Time trial

For the fourth time in a row Ellen van Dijk won the time trial.

Road race

See also
2015 in women's road cycling

References

External links

Omloop van Borsele
EPZ Omloop van Borsele
EPZ Omloop van Borsele